Qaleh-ye Kamohammad Reza (also Romanized as Qal‘eh-ye Kāmoḩammad Reẕā; also known as Qal‘eh-ye Kāmoḩammad Ẕīā) is a village in Zhan Rural District, in the Central District of Dorud County, Lorestan Province, Iran. At the 2006 census, its population was 187, in 39 families.

References 

Towns and villages in Dorud County